Symphony in F can refer to:

List of symphonies in F minor
List of symphonies in F major

See also
List of symphonies by key